Clovis-Thomas Richard (May 8, 1892 – August 22, 1976) was a Canadian lawyer and political figure in the Province of New Brunswick. He was born in South Framingham, Massachusetts and raised in College Bridge, New Brunswick. He was educated at University of St. Joseph's College, earning a BA degree before attending Dalhousie University where he graduated in 1918 with a Bachelor of Laws degree.

Richard was a member of the Canadian Expeditionary Force during World War I. After the war, he practiced law; then, in a 1926 by-election to replace Peter Veniot who had been elected to the House of Commons of Canada in Ottawa, Richard won election to the Legislative Assembly of New Brunswick as the Liberal party candidate for the riding of Gloucester County. He was reelected in 1930, 1935, 1939, and 1944.

Richard served as the Provincial Secretary-Treasurer from  July 16, 1935 to January 10, 1940. He left provincial politics in 1945 to successfully run for a seat in the Canadian House of Commons as the Liberal Party of Canada candidate in the riding of Gloucester. Reelected in the 1949 Federal election, he served in Ottawa until retiring from politics in 1952.

Elecotral record

References 

1892 births
1976 deaths
20th-century Canadian politicians
20th-century Canadian lawyers
Acadian people
St. Joseph's College alumni
Dalhousie University alumni
Lawyers in New Brunswick
Canadian military personnel of World War I
New Brunswick Liberal Association MLAs
Members of the Executive Council of New Brunswick
Liberal Party of Canada MPs
Members of the House of Commons of Canada from New Brunswick
Canadian Roman Catholics
People from Framingham, Massachusetts
People from Westmorland County, New Brunswick
Finance ministers of New Brunswick